Suminski or Sumiński (feminine: Sumińska; plural: Sumińscy) is a Polish surname. It may refer to:

 Dave Suminski (1931–2005), American football player
 Michał Hieronim Leszczyc-Sumiński (1820–1898), Polish botanist and painter

See also
 

Polish-language surnames